The Lanterns, part of the Tasman Island Group, are three small and very steep islands with a combined area of , lying close to the south-eastern coast of Tasmania, Australia. The island is located in the Tasman Sea, situated off the Tasman Peninsula and is contained within the Tasman National Park.

Fauna
Recorded breeding seabird species are little penguin, short-tailed shearwater and fairy prion.  The peregrine falcon has also bred there.

See also

 List of islands of Tasmania

References

Islands of Tasmania
Tasman National Park